À la recherche du bonheur is the fourth studio album by French pop-R&B singer-songwriter Leslie, released on September 6, 2010. It is Bourgoin's first and only album under the independent label, Artop Records. The album was produced by the duo Kore, and it mixes electro and dance elements with Bourgoin's established R&B sound. The album's lyrical content explores themes about love, happiness, and empowerment, as well as current social and political issues. It is Bourgoin's most personal album to date, drawing inspiration from her family, childhood, and experiences as a young Paris newcomer.

Track listing

Charts

Weekly charts

References

2010 albums
Leslie (singer) albums